Serhat Sağat (born 2 February 1983) is a Turkish former footballer.

External links

1983 births
Sportspeople from İzmit
Living people
Turkish footballers
Association football midfielders
Kocaelispor footballers
Sakaryaspor footballers
Tokatspor footballers
Karşıyaka S.K. footballers
Gaziosmanpaşaspor footballers
Kırklarelispor footballers
TKİ Tavşanlı Linyitspor footballers
Süper Lig players
TFF First League players
TFF Second League players